Pie de Pepe is a village in Medio Baudó Municipality, Chocó Department in Colombia.

Climate
Pie de Pepe has a very wet tropical rainforest climate (Af).

References

Populated places in the Chocó Department